Pemanggil Island ) is an island in Mersing District, Johor, Malaysia.

Geography
The island sits 45 km east of Mersing mainland.

Pemanggil Island is known for deep-sea fishing and good hunting grounds for marlins and mackerels. It has also hill at the outcrop of the island. On the north-eastern coast of the island is Teluk Lancang, an isolated bay. At the center of the island lies a huge boulder known locally as Batu Buau which locals regard as sacred.

Transportation
The island is accessible by boat from Mersing Town.

See also
 List of islands of Malaysia

References

External links
 Travel Guide: Pemanggil Island
 Malaysia Guide and information on Pemanggil Island

Islands of Johor
Mersing District